David William Gordon (February 27, 1832 – February 19, 1893) was a Canadian politician from British Columbia.

Gordon was born in Camden Township, Upper Canada, the son of Michael Gordon. He went to California in 1856 and then moved to British Columbia in 1858, where he established himself as a professional architect and builder in Nanaimo, British Columbia.  Gordon was a prominent citizen and one of the wealthiest men in the city.  He ran as an unaffiliated candidate in the 1875 provincial election, losing a close race to John Bryden, an "opposition" candidate.  Gordon was later successful in an 1877 by-election called because of Bryden’s resignation.  He served as "government" member, supporting  Premier George Anthony Walkem.  He was unable to retain the seat in the following general election.

Gordon ran as a Liberal-Conservative  candidate in the federal election just two months following his provincial defeat in 1878.  He was unable to unseat incumbent Liberal Arthur Bunster in the Vancouver (Island) district.  Gordon was not deterred and later defeated Bunster by a wide margin in the following election, in 1882.  He was re-elected over a Conservative opponent 1887 and acclaimed in 1891.  Gordon died in office in 1893.

Gordon was married twice: to Emma Elizabeth Robb in 1864 and to Statira Catherine Shepard in 1886.

References 

Members of the House of Commons of Canada from British Columbia
Conservative Party of Canada (1867–1942) MPs
1832 births
1893 deaths